Decapoint, or raphigraphy, was a tactile form of the Latin script invented by Louis Braille as a system that could be used by both the blind and sighted. It was published in 1839. Letters retained their linear form, and so were legible without training to the sighted, but the lines were composed of embossed dots like those used in braille. Each letter contained ten dots in the height and different dots in the width to produce the graphic form of print.

The reason for the development of this writing was that relatives of the students could not read braille.

These letters were not easy for the blind to write because of their height of ten dots despite grid. It therefore did not take long for the blind friend of Louis Braille, Pierre-François-Victor Foucault, to build in 1841 the first apparatus, the Raphigraph, which could push all the points of one column of characters at the same time into the paper. This font was now named Raphigraphy (Raphigrafie or Raphigraphie).

When the first typewriters were invented, they quickly replaced the complicated Raphigraphy or decapoint, despite the impossibility for the blind to read the writing of typewriters.

References
Louis Invents Decapoint, American Foundation for the Blind
 Source: Louis Braille: Brochure from 1839 (French) Nouveau procede pour representer des points la forme meme des letters, les cartes de geographie, les figures de geometrie, les caracteres de musiques, etc., a l'usage des aveugles (New Method for Representing by Dots the Form of the Letters Themselves, Maps, Geometric Figures, Musical Symbols, etc., for Use by the Blind)
 The Raphigraphie by Louis Braille in 1839, character set worked up optically (German)

Braille
Tactile alphabets
Writing systems introduced in 1839